The Brad is a left tributary of the river Suciu in Romania. It flows into the Suciu near Groșii Țibleșului.

References

Rivers of Romania
Rivers of Maramureș County